Annette Moreno (born April 26, 1972) is an American singer and songwriter who performs in the Spanish language. Since her first solo album in 1995 she has released 15 albums, a singles collection and a live DVD. She was previously a member of Rojo and comes from a musical family. Moreno has toured around Latin America and Europe.

Biography 
Annette Moreno was born on April 26, 1972, in San Diego, the daughter of Eliezer Moreno, songwriter and singer and a Mexican immigrant. The third in a family of twelve, music was central to her upbringing as her parents performed as Dueto Moreno. In the mid 1970s, they moved to Tucson, Arizona, where her father became a pastor. Like her siblings, she began her singing career at a young age. Moreno began to devote herself to her father's church in her youth. With training and education in music from the age of 12 she began her career in the Mariachi group "Los Salmos" led by her parents, featuring as a violinist and singer for twelve years. Besides supplying vocals, Moreno also began to write lyrics. Her sisters Lilian, Karina, Esther Linda and Keila are also recording artists.

Later in 1995, she recorded her first album called Volar Libre. In 2000 she joined the Rojo, playing Christian rock music, which recorded a self-titled album in 2001. It brought a degree of success and in the same year she recorded her second solo album El Amor que me das, which is nominated for a Ritmo Latino award. It was followed by her third solo album Un Ángel Llora released in October 2002. It received international recognition and won her an ARPA Award. At the end of 2003 Moreno released the seasonal album Navidad.

The 2004 album Ruleta Rusa became an international success, while a greatest hits collection Rewind was released towards the end of the year. In early 2005 she released her first live album En Vivo on CD and DVD. A more personal self-titled album was released in 2006. After a break, Moreno returned to live-performance in 2010 with an extensive tour of Europe and Latin America. In 2011 she released the album Barco de papel where the title-track was released as a single. The following year she recorded a duet "Demente" with the band Tercer Cielo.

In 2013 she published Los Perros Que Ladran, a book outlining her religious inspiration.

In 2009 she married the drummer in her band, Donnie Serrano, and lives in Arizona with their four sons.

Discography

Studio albums

Extended plays

Compilation albums

Live / special edition albums

As featured artist

Awards and nominations

Arpa Awards

Diosa de Plata Awards

Latin Grammy

References

External links
 
 

1972 births
Living people
American performers of Christian music
American musicians of Mexican descent
Spanish-language singers of the United States
Christian music songwriters
Musicians from San Diego
Singers from California
21st-century American singers